Francis Duru  (born July 27, 1969) is a Nigerian actor who in 2007 received the United Nations Ambassador of Peace award for his positive influence on the youths. In 2010 Duru was appointed as the interim president of the Actors Guild of Nigeria and also in the same year was nominated for Best Actor in a Supporting Role at the Africa Movie Academy Awards.

Early life and education
Duru was born on July 27, 1969 in Cameroon to Nigerian parents who hail from Imo State a southeastern geographical location of Nigeria. He received both primary and secondary school education in Cameroon but in order to obtain a B.Sc. degree, he moved to Nigeria where he applied to the University of Port Harcourt in Rivers State and was accepted as an undergraduate to study Theatre arts. In 1996 he obtained a B.Sc. degree in Theatre Arts.

Career
Duru debuted in the Nigerian movie industry in 1989 with a movie titled Missing Mark. The movie was directed by the now deceased director; Ndubuisi Oko. Duru’s feature in the movie did not do enough for his career as at the time he was still regarded as an up-and-coming actor.

Duru became more prominent in the Nigerian movie industry in 1994 after featuring in an action comedy movie titled Rattle Snake a movie produced by now deceased director; Amaka Igwe. He played a significant role in a character called Ahanna.

Award
Duru was a recipient of the United Nations Ambassador of Peace award for his positive influence on the youths. He won the Best Actor in a Leading Role (Igbo) award in 2020 Best of Nollywood Awards for his role in Mboputa.

Humanitarian works
Duru has worked extensively with local and foreign non-governmental organizations (NGOs) in order to ensure that African children have a better education and a higher standard of living. According to a Nigerian reputable print media called the Vanguard, Duru has worked with UNICEF, USAID, LEAP AFRICA and COMPASS.

Personal life
Duru and his wife Adokiye got married in 2003 and both have four children together. Duru and Adokiye both attended the University of Port Harcourt.

Selected filmography
The Good Husband (2020)
Mboputa (2020)
Stigma (2013)
Home In Exile (2010)
Nnenda (2009)
Always Mine (2009)
Breaking Heart (2009)
Entanglement (2009)
Bless My Soul (2008) as Emeka
Lumba Boys (2008)
One On One (2008)
Worst Enemy (2008)
Laviva (2007)
Final War (2007)
Gods Of No Mercy (2007)
Great Ambassadors (2007)
House In Crisis (2007)
Love And Likeness (2007)
Persecution (2007)
Rhythm Of Love (2007)
Royal Grandmother (2007) as Azubuike
Short Of Time (2007)
Silent Whispers (2007)
Total War (2007) as Pastor Henry
Warriors Of Satan (2007)
Will Of God (2007)
Clash Of Interest (2006)
Forces Of Nature (2006)
My Girl Friend (2006)
My Little Secret (2006)
Personal Assignment (2006) 
Soul Engagement (2006)
Soul Engagement II (2006)
Soul Engagement III (2006)
Sound Of Love (2006)
Sound Of Love II (2006)
Sweet Sound (2006)
Sweet Sound II (2006)
Tears From Holland (2006)
Tears From Holland II (2006)
Upside Down (2006)
Upside Down II (2006)
Without Apology (2006)
Without Apology II (2006)
Rattle Snake (1995)
Missing Mark (1989)

Awards and nominations

References

External links

1969 births
Living people
Igbo male actors
University of Port Harcourt alumni
21st-century Nigerian male actors
Nigerian male television actors
Nigerian male film actors
Actors from Imo State